Africa's Blood is a studio album by Lee Perry, released in 1972.

Track listing

Side one
"Do Your Thing" (Perry), performed by Dave Barker – 3:49
"Dream Land" (Perry) – 2:38
"Long Sentence" (Perry) – 2:25
"Not Guilty" (Perry) – 3:12
"Cool and Easy" (Perry) – 2:32
"Well Dread Version 3" (Perry), performed by The Upsetters featuring Addis Ababa Children – 2:32
"My Girl" (Smokey Robinson/Ronald White) – 3:16

Side two
"Saw Dust" (Perry) – 2:23
"Place Called Africa Version 3" (Perry), performed by Winston Prince – 2:51
"Isn't It Wrong" (Perry), performed by Lee Perry featuring The Hurricanes – 2:52
"Go Slow" (Perry) – 2:58
"Bad Luck" (Perry) – 2:49
"Move Me" (Perry) – 2:34
"Surplus" (Perry) – 2:13

References

The Upsetters albums
1972 albums
Albums produced by Lee "Scratch" Perry
Trojan Records albums